Anselmo Müller (February 22, 1932 – March 24, 2011) was the Roman Catholic bishop of the Roman Catholic Diocese of Januária, Brazil.

Born in Brazil, Müller was ordained a priest in 1961. In 1984, Müller was appointed bishop of the Januária Diocese and retired in 2008.

Notes

20th-century Roman Catholic bishops in Brazil
Brazilian people of German descent
1932 births
2011 deaths
People from Santa Cruz do Sul
21st-century Roman Catholic bishops in Brazil
Roman Catholic bishops of Januária